Pax Hill (Peace Hill), near Bentley, Hampshire, England, was the family home of Robert Baden-Powell, founder of the Scout movement, and his wife, Olave, for over twenty years during the 20th century. It is located at the end of a half-mile drive, off the main A31 road.

Pax Hill is a red-bricked house fronting south with higher ground behind. In the Baden-Powell family's time, there was a rose garden with dovecote at one side of the front of the house. Elsewhere, there were two summer houses, a shrubbery and a tennis court. Scouts and Guides camped on either side of the drive. The Baden-Powells added two wings. The west wing was designed by Robert Baden-Powell himself and he also modelled the frieze for the new bathroom, depicting fish in the River Wey.

The house was originally called "Blackacre" and was purchased with a gift from Olave Baden-Powell's father in 1918. In 1929, it was burgled and a number of souvenirs were stolen. They moved to Kenya in 1939 and Robert Baden-Powell died in 1941. The following year, due to World War II, Pax Hill was occupied by Canadian military troops and by way of recompense, Olave Baden-Powell was awarded a 'grace and favour' apartment in Hampton Court Palace.

After World War II, Olave Baden-Powell gave Pax Hill to the Girl Guides Association (now Girlguiding UK) to be used as a centre for members from the Commonwealth of Nations. The house became a Domestic Science Training School run on Guiding principles. The interest from £40,000 in the B.P. Memorial Fund was used to fund its upkeep. In April 1953, Pax Hill was sold with the consent of Olave Baden-Powell.  In the late 1970s and early 1980s Pax Hill was a boys boarding school. It has been a nursing home since 1988.

See also

 Don Potter

References

External links
 Pax Hill Residential and Nursing Home for the Elderly
 Olave Baden-Powell timeline

Year of establishment missing
Country houses in Hampshire
Places associated with Scouting
Nursing homes in the United Kingdom